A street scene is a model for theatre proposed by Bertolt Brecht.

Street Scene may refer to:
 Street Scene (play), 1929, by Elmer Rice
 Street Scene (film), 1931, directed by King Vidor, based on Rice's play
 Street Scene (opera), 1947, by Kurt Weill, based on Rice's play
 Street Scene (San Diego music festival)
 Street Scenes 1970, a documentary directed by Martin Scorsese
 Street photography